Comilla Adarsha Sadar is an upazila of Comilla District in the Division of Chittagong, Bangladesh.

Demographics 

According to the 2011 Census of Bangladesh, Comilla Adarsha Sadar upazila has a population of 532,419 living in 105,783 households. Comilla Adarsha Sadar has a sex ratio of 971 females per 1000 males and a literacy rate of 65.75%. 296,010 (55.60%) live in urban areas.

Administration
Comilla Adarsha Sadar Upazila is divided into Comilla Municipality and eight union parishads: Amratoli, Dakshin Durgapur, Jagannathpur, Kalir Bazar, Panchthubi, Uttar Durgapur, and Comilla Cantonment. The union parishads are subdivided into 145 mauzas and 196 villages.

Comilla Municipality is subdivided into 18 wards and 49 mahallas.

See also
 Upazilas of Bangladesh
 Districts of Bangladesh
 Divisions of Bangladesh

References

 
Upazilas of Comilla District